The 1913 Duquesne Dukes football team represented Duquesne University during the 1913 college football season. The head coach was Norman "Bill" Budd, coaching his first season with the Dukes.

Schedule

References

Duquesne
Duquesne Dukes football seasons
Duquesne Dukes football